Magdeleine Willame-Boonen (1940 – 17 May 2021) was a Belgian politician who served as a Senator.

References

1940 births
2021 deaths
Women members of the Senate (Belgium)
Université catholique de Louvain alumni
Order of Leopold (Belgium)
People from Woluwe-Saint-Pierre